Euler substitution is a method for evaluating integrals of the form

In such cases, the integrand can be changed to a rational function by using the substitutions of Euler.

Euler's first substitution
The first substitution of Euler is used when . We substitute

In this substitution, either the positive sign or the negative sign can be chosen.

Euler's second substitution
If , we take

We solve for  similarly as above and find

Again, either the positive or the negative sign can be chosen.

Euler's third substitution
. This yields 

Worked examples

Examples for Euler's first substitution

One 

In the integral  we can use the first substitution and set , thus

Accordingly, we obtain:

The cases  give the formulas

Two 
For finding the value of 
 
we find  using the first substitution of Euler, . Squaring both sides of the equation gives us , from which the  terms will cancel out. Solving for  yields 

Hence,

Examples for Euler's second substitution 

In the integral 
 
we can use the second substitution and set . Thus

and

Accordingly, we obtain:

Examples for Euler's third substitution 
To evaluate
 
we can use the third substitution and set . Thus

and

Next,

As we can see this is a rational function which can be solved using partial fractions.

Generalizations

The substitutions of Euler can be generalized by allowing the use of imaginary numbers. For example, in the integral , the substitution  can be used. Extensions to the complex numbers allows us to use every type of Euler substitution regardless of the coefficients on the quadratic.

The substitutions of Euler can be generalized to a larger class of functions. Consider integrals of the form

This integral can be transformed by the substitution  into another integral

In principle, factorization and partial fraction decomposition can be employed to break the integral down into simple terms, which can be integrated analytically through use of the dilogarithm function.

See also 

 Integration by substitution
 Trigonometric substitution
 Weierstrass substitution

References

Integral calculus